María Vijande Alonso (born 14 October 1995) is a Spanish badminton player and pharmacist (University of Salamanca, 2018). She is currently a clinical research associate trainee in GEICAM (Spanish Breast Cancer Group) and writer in Mejor con Salud, Spanish blog on health.

Achievements

BWF International Challenge/Series 
Mixed doubles

  BWF International Challenge tournament
  BWF International Series tournament
  BWF Future Series tournament

References

External links 
 

Living people
1995 births
Spanish female badminton players
21st-century Spanish women